David V. Fraser-Hidalgo (born November 25, 1969) is an Ecuadorian-born American politician and a member of the Maryland House of Delegates representing District 15 in Montgomery County, Maryland. He was appointed to complete the term of Delegate Brian J. Feldman following Feldman's appointment to a Senate seat and has since been elected to his own full term.

Early life and education
Fraser-Hidalgo was born November 25, 1969 in Quito, Ecuador. He grew up in Montgomery County, Maryland, attending Albert Einstein High School in Kensington, Maryland. In 1992, he earned a B.A. in History from St. Mary's College of Maryland.

For three years, Fraser-Hidalgo served as a police officer in Montgomery County before leaving the police force and entering the business world. He has worked for a number of firms, most recently as an area sales director for Regus. He has also been involved in a variety of volunteer activities in the county, including as a leader in the Boyds Civic Association and stints on the boards of the Montgomery County Chamber of Commerce and the Hispanic Chamber of Commerce.

In 2010, Fraser-Hidalgo unsuccessfully ran for the Maryland House of Delegates in District 15, coming in fourth place with 8.8 percent of the vote.

In the legislature
In 2013, the retirement of Senator Robert J. Garagiola from the Maryland Senate prompted the appointment of Delegate Brian J. Feldman to fill the remainder of Garagiola's term. This left an open Delegate seat, which was contested by a number of applicants. Fraser-Hidalgo won the final vote of the Montgomery County Democratic Central Committee by a close margin, and on October 16, 2013 was appointed by Governor Martin O'Malley to fill the seat. He was sworn in on October 21, 2013.

In February 2015, Hidalgo joined state Senator Victor Ramirez and Delegates Maricé Morales, Will Campos, and Ana Sol Gutierrez in organizing the Maryland Latino Legislative Caucus, becoming one of the caucus' first six members.

Political positions

Environment
Fraser-Hidalgo has repeatedly introduced legislation that would ban the practice of fracking in Maryland. During the 2017 legislative session, his bill passed and was signed into law by Governor Larry Hogan on April 4, 2017.

Fraser-Hidalgo introduced legislation in the 2019 legislative session that would increase the state's electric vehicle tax credit to $3,000. The bill passed and was signed into law by Governor Hogan on April 30, 2019. A bill extending the tax credit was introduced and passed during the 2022 legislative session and was signed into law on April 21, 2022.

Fraser-Hidalgo introduced legislation in the 2021 legislative session that would charge polluters a carbon fee for their greenhouse gas emissions, investing the revenue earned from the fee into education and green infrastructure. The bill received an unfavorable committee report.

Fraser-Hidalgo introduced legislation in the 2022 legislative session that would set goals for electrifying the state's vehicle fleet, with 100 percent of passenger cars purchased to be electric by 2028 and all passenger cars in the fleet to be electric by 2031.

Marijuana
Fraser-Hidalgo introduced legislation in the 2018 legislative session that would create a pilot program authorizing both growing and processing operations for industrial hemp. The bill passed and was signed into law by Governor Hogan on May 8, 2018. He introduced legislation during the 2019 legislation to fully legalize commercial hemp farming, which was signed into law by Hogan on April 30, 2019.

Social issues
Fraser-Hidalgo introduced legislation in the 2016 legislative session that would have strengthened laws on underage drinking. The bill was watered down during committee hearings, but passed and became law on May 19, 2016.

Fraser-Hidalgo introduced legislation in the 2020 legislative session that would require special elections to fill vacancies in the Maryland General Assembly.

Personal life
Fraser-Hidalgo lives in Boyds, Maryland in a home that is almost completely autonomous. He is married to his wife, Lisa Bethel, and has two children, Samantha and Scott. In the early spring of 2018, his wife passed away from cancer.

Electoral history

References

1969 births
Living people
Democratic Party members of the Maryland House of Delegates
People from Montgomery County, Maryland
Ecuadorian emigrants to the United States
American politicians of Ecuadorian descent
Hispanic and Latino American state legislators in Maryland
People from Quito
St. Mary's College of Maryland alumni
St. Mary's College of Maryland
American municipal police officers
21st-century American politicians